Earl Erne, of Crom Castle in the County of Fermanagh, is a title in the Peerage of Ireland. It was created in 1789 for John Creighton, 2nd Baron Erne, who had earlier represented Lifford (Parliament of Ireland constituency) in the Irish House of Commons. He had already been made Viscount Erne, of Crom Castle in the County of Fermanagh, in 1781, also in the Peerage of Ireland, and sat from 1800 to 1828 as an Irish Representative Peer in the British House of Lords. The title of Baron Erne, of Crom Castle in the County of Fermanagh, was created in the Peerage of Ireland in 1768 for his father Abraham Creighton. The Earl was succeeded by his eldest son, the second Earl. On his death the titles passed to his nephew, the third Earl. He was an Irish Representative Peer from 1845 to 1885 and also served as Lord Lieutenant of County Fermanagh during the same period. In 1876 he was created Baron Fermanagh, of Lisnaskea in the County of Fermanagh, in the Peerage of the United Kingdom. This was to allow the Earls to sit in the House of Lords by right, rather than having to stand for election as Representative Peers. An earlier title of Baroness Fermanagh in the Peerage of Ireland was created for Mary Verney on 13 June 1792, but became extinct on her death on 15 November 1810.

Lord Erne also changed the spelling of the family surname from Creighton to Crichton. He was succeeded by his son, the fourth Earl. He was a Conservative politician and served as a Lord of the Treasury in the second Conservative administration of Benjamin Disraeli. Like his father he was also Lord Lieutenant of County Fermanagh. His grandson, the fifth Earl, held minor office from 1936 to 1939 in the National Government led by Stanley Baldwin and later Neville Chamberlain. Lord Erne was killed in the Second World War. The 6th Earl (often known as Harry Erne), who succeeded in 1940, was the Lord Lieutenant of County Fermanagh from 1986 until 2012. On his death in 2015, he was succeeded by his only son, the 7th Earl. 

The 3rd Earl is also remembered as the employer of Captain Charles Boycott, whose mishandling of relations with agricultural workers on Lord Erne's estate in County Mayo caused a political and public order crisis and provoked the strategy that gave the English language the term to boycott. 

The invented title of Viscount Crichton is used as a courtesy title for the Earl's heir apparent.

The family seat is Crom Castle, near Newtownbutler, County Fermanagh, Northern Ireland.

Barons Erne (1768)
Abraham Creighton, 1st Baron Erne ( – 1772)
John Creighton, 2nd Baron Erne (1731–1828) (created Viscount Erne in 1781)

Viscounts Erne (1781)
John Creighton, 1st Viscount Erne (1731–1828) (created Earl Erne in 1789)

Earls Erne (1789)
John Creighton, 1st Earl Erne (1731–1828)
Abraham Creighton, 2nd Earl Erne (1765–1842)
John Crichton, 3rd Earl Erne (1802–1885) (created Baron Fermanagh in 1876)
John Henry Crichton, 4th Earl Erne (1839–1914)
John Henry George Crichton, 5th Earl Erne (1907–1940)
Henry George Victor John Crichton, 6th Earl Erne (1937–2015)
 John Henry Michael Ninian Crichton, 7th Earl Erne (born 1971)

Present peer
John Henry Michael Ninian Crichton, 7th Earl Erne (born 19 June 1971), is the son of the 6th Earl and his wife Camilla Marguerite Roberts. Styled formally as Viscount Crichton from birth, he was educated at Sunningdale School, Shiplake College, Henley-on-Thames, and at L'Institut de Touraine, in Tours, France.

On 23 December 2015, he succeeded his father as Earl Erne of Crom Castle (I., 1789), Viscount Erne of Crom Castle (I., 1781), Baron Erne of Crom Castle (I., 1768), and as the Baron Fermanagh of Lisnaskea (U.K., 1876).

On 4 May 2019, at Holy Trinity Church, Crom, County Fermanagh, near Crom Castle, the family seat which he still owns, Erne was married to Harriet Elizabeth Patterson, daughter of Alan James Patterson, by Ferran Glenfield, Church of Ireland Bishop of Kilmore, Elphin and Ardagh.

The heir presumptive is the present holder's second cousin once removed, Charles David Blayney Crichton (born 1953), who has a son, Oliver Charles Martin Crichton (born 1995).

Male-line family tree

Notes

References

Kidd, Charles, Williamson, David (editors). Debrett's Peerage and Baronetage (1990 edition). New York: St Martin's Press, 1990, 

The London Gazette

Earldoms in the Peerage of Ireland
Earl
 
Noble titles created in 1789